Fan Bwlch Chwyth is a peak in the Fforest Fawr section of the Brecon Beacons National Park and within the county of Powys.

Its summit (at 603 m) is marked by a trig point at OS grid ref SN 912217.

Geology 
The hill is formed from sandstones and mudstones of the Senni Beds Formation and Brownstones Formation of the Old Red Sandstone laid down during the Devonian period. A north-northwest - south-southeast trending fault runs across its north-eastern face.

This face is much the steepest and has its origins in the ice ages when a minor glacier grew at this spot.  It has left a couple of arcuate moraines which are readily seen from the track. The glaciated rock face has been quarried. The quarry is designated as a site of special scientific interest for its geological interest.

Access 
The entire hill is open country across which the walker can wander at will. A bridleway runs south-eastward from the minor road between Heol Senni and the A4067 road. The bridleway follows, in part at least, the vehicular track (no public vehicular access) to the disused quarry.

References

External links 
 images of Fan Bwlch Chwyth on Geograph website

Mountains and hills of Powys
Fforest Fawr